The Tamou Total Reserve is a nature reserve in the southwest of Niger. It is a Total Faunal Reserve IUCN type IV, covering some 75,600 hectares within the Tillaberi Region.  The reserve abuts W du Niger, and is primarily dedicated to the protection of African Elephant populations which migrate through the region.

References

unep-wcmc site record
World Database on Protected Areas / UNEP-World Conservation Monitoring Centre (UNEP-WCMC), 2008.
Biodiversity and Protected Areas-- Niger, Earth Trends country profile (2003)

National parks of Niger
Protected areas established in 1962